The Military ranks of Morocco are the military insignia used by the Royal Moroccan Armed Forces. Morocco shares a rank structure similar to that of France.

Commissioned officer ranks
The rank insignia of commissioned officers.

Other ranks
The rank insignia of non-commissioned officers and enlisted personnel.

References

External links
 

Morocco
Military of Morocco
Morocco